Litky is a village located in Korosten Raion, Zhytomyr Oblast (province) of Ukraine. 

Litky was previously located in the Luhyny Raion. The raion was abolished on 18 July 2020 as part of the administrative reform of Ukraine, which reduced the number of raions of Zhytomyr Oblast to four. The area of Luhyny Raion was merged into Korosten Raion.

References

Villages in Korosten Raion